The 2010–11 season is the 17th season of Sun Hei SC in Hong Kong First Division League. The team is coached by Brazilian coach José Ricardo Rambo.

Squad statistics

Statistics accurate as of match played 26 September 2010

Matches

Competitive

Hong Kong First Division League

Hong Kong Senior Challenge Shield

References

Sun Hei
Sun Hei SC seasons